Multan Division is an administrative division of Punjab Province, Pakistan. The reforms of 2000 abolished the third tier of government but the division system was restored again in 2008.

Districts

It consists of the following districts:

History
Multan Division was created during the British colonial rule in the South Asia. During British rule, All the districts that later formed Dera Ghazi Khan Division, collectively formed a district of Multan Division. Sahiwal region was part of the division till 1980s when separate Sahiwal division was created.

The division lay between 28°25' and 33°13 N and 69°19' and 73°39 E, the Sutlej divided it from Bahawalpur on the south-east, while the Indus flowed partly through the Division and partly along its border to the west. The headquarters of the Commissioner were at Multan (or in the hot season, at Fort Munro). The Division was abolished in 1884, but reconstituted in 1901. According to the 1881 census of India the population of the area now included was 2,036,956, in 1891 it had risen to 2,277,605, and in 1901 to 3,014,675.

Demographics 
According to 2017 census, Multan division had a population of 12,268,173, which includes 6,243,053 males and 6,023,825 females. 
Multan division constitutes 12,163,327 Muslims,  97,278 Christians, 4,264 Ahmadi followed by 1,578 Hindus, 1,357 scheduled castes and 369 others.

Notable People 
 Yousuf Raza Gilani (Ex-PM of Pakistan)
 Rafique Rajwana (Ex Governor Punjab)
 Shah Mehmood Qureshi (Foreign Minister of Pakistan)
 Javed Hashmi (Senior Politician)
 Inzamam ul Haq ( Crickter)
 Waqar Younis (Cricketer)
 Mian Usman Khalid Arain (Politician Chairman State Youth Parliament Multan Division)
 Mirza Muhammad Farooq Jan.
CEO.Mehar Engineering

See also 
 Divisions of Pakistan
 Divisions of Punjab, Pakistan

References

Divisions of Punjab, Pakistan